The 2011 Virginia state elections took place on November 8, 2011. All 140 seats in the Virginia General Assembly were up for re-election, as were many local offices.

Virginia Senate

Prior to the election, 22 seats were held by Democrats and 18 seats were held by Republicans. Redistricting caused the 13th district to be moved from Hampton Roads to Northern Virginia and the 22nd district to be moved from the Roanoke area to a district stretching from Lynchburg to Richmond. Republicans gained two seats, making the Senate tied with 20 Democrats and 20 Republicans.

Four incumbent senators chose to retire: Fred Quayle (R-13), Patsy Ticer (D-30), Mary Margaret Whipple (D-31), and William Wampler Jr. (R-40). In addition, two senators, Ralph K. Smith (R-22) and Bill Stanley (R-19) chose to seek re-election in new districts: Smith went from the 22nd to Stanley's 19th, while Stanley opted to challenge incumbent Democrat Roscoe Reynolds in the 20th.

Results

Note: Only races with more than one candidate running are listed below. Unofficial results from the State Board of Elections website.

Party abbreviations: D - Democratic Party, R - Republican Party, IG - Independent Green Party, I - Independent.

Virginia House of Delegates

Prior to the election, the House of Delegates consisted of 58 Republicans, 39 Democrats, 2 Independents, with one vacant seat previously held by a Republican (Glenn Oder of the 94th district, who resigned in August 2011). Redistricting eliminated three seats: Southwestern Virginia's 2nd district, the Martinsville-area 10th district, and the Norfolk-based 87th district. These three seats were moved to Northern Virginia. Republicans gained seven seats from the Democrats and one seat from a retiring independent, making the House's composition 67 Republicans, 32 Democrats, and 1 Independent.

Thirteen incumbents chose not to seek another term in the House: Bud Phillips (D-2), Bill Carrico (R-5), Dave Nutter (R-7), Jim Shuler (D-12), Bill Cleaveland (R-17), Clay Athey (R-18), Adam Ebbin (D-49), Bill Janis (R-56), Watkins Abbitt, Jr. (I-59), Paula Miller (D-87), Glenn Oder (R-94), Harvey Morgan (R-98), and Albert C. Pollard (R-99).

Three Delegates retired in order to seek State Senate seats: Bill Carrico (R-5) opted to run for the open 40th district seat, Dave Nutter (R-7) decided to challenge incumbent Democratic Senator John Edwards in the 21st district, and Adam Ebbin (D-49) chose to run for the open 30th district seat.

Del. Ward Armstrong (D-10) decided to challenge Republican Del. Charles Poindexter in the 9th district rather than retire.

Notes

References

 
Virginia